Eduardo Delani Santos Leite (born 3 November 1981) is a retired Brazilian professional footballer.

Career
Delani was brought to Europe in early 2005 by Swedish Allsvenskan club Halmstads BK. Due to a severe knee injury the transfer was delayed until the summer, becoming the first Brazilian to play for the club ever. After the 2006 season Halmstads BK chose not to extend Delani's contract. He returned home to Brazil and he played for the club Clube de Regatas Brasil for a short time before returning to Scandinavia, this time signing for the Danish club Vejle Boldklub. On 26 July 2007 he signed a one-year contract with the club.

Eduardo Delani is the double first cousin of the professional football player Kaká, a player for Orlando City, and Kaká's brother Digão, who last played for New York Red Bulls. Their respective fathers are brothers, and their respective mothers are sisters.

Honours
Guangzhou Evergrande
 China League One: 2010

References

External links

 Profile at Soccerway
 Vejle Boldklub profile 

Living people
1981 births
Association football midfielders
Association football forwards
Brazilian footballers
Brazilian expatriate footballers
Danish Superliga players
Allsvenskan players
Halmstads BK players
Vejle Boldklub players
Viborg FF players
Guangzhou F.C. players
Botafogo de Futebol e Regatas players
China League One players
Clube de Regatas Brasil players
Cruzeiro Esporte Clube players
Marília Atlético Clube players
Expatriate footballers in Sweden
Brazilian expatriate sportspeople in China
Expatriate men's footballers in Denmark
Brazilian expatriate sportspeople in Sweden
Expatriate footballers in China
Brazilian expatriate sportspeople in Denmark
Footballers from Brasília